These lists show the comic strips that are contained within each Beano Annual.

The Beano Book 1940

Comics
Big Eggo
Pansy Potter
Good King Coke
Rip Van Wink
Tin Can Tommy
Ping the Elastic Man
The Pranks of Hicky the Hare
Lord Snooty and his Pals
Wee Peem
Brave Captain Kipper
Whoopee Hank the Slap Dash Sheriff
Hooky's Magic Bowler Hat
Ho Lummy
Tricky Dicky Ant
Benny Blowhard
Dingo the Doggie
Boss and Bert
Rupert the Rabbit
Frosty McNab
Podge (Appeared in The Dandy)
Helpful Henry
Hard-Nut the Nigger
Smiler the Sweeper
Little Dead Eye Dick
Puffing Billy
Monkey Tricks
Marmaduke Mean the Miser

Picture stories
Wild Boy of the Woods
In the Land of the Silver Dwarfs

Text stories
Tom Thumb to the Rescue
The Wishing Tree
12 Happy Horners
Baldy wins his freedom
Teacher Takes a Licking
The Flying Horse
Cripple Charlie
Black Flash the Beaver
The Singing Giant

The Beano Book 1941

Comics
Big Eggo
Lord Snooty and his Pals
Pansy Potter
Hooky's Magic Bowler Hat
Deep-Down Daddy Neptune
Tough Nellie Duff
Contrary Mary
Puffing Billy
Rip Van Wink
Tin-Can Tommy
Tricky Dicky Ant
Dingo the Doggie
Ping the Elastic Man
Wee Peem
Cocky Dick
Winken and Blinken
Frosty McNab
Good King Coke
Roland Ham
Hairy Dan
Boss and Bert
Wily Willie Winkie
Brainy Bill

Picture Stories
Wild Boy of the Woods
Prince on the Flying Horse

Text Stories
The Little Joker in the Land of Nod
Terrible Joe Jenners
Sir Tom Thumb
A Man on the Moon
Stephen's Speed Boots
The Boy with the Magic Mask
Young Strong-Arm the Axeman
Orphan Jim and Jacko
Jack Sprat's Battle Cat
Keeper of the Crooked Cross

The Beano Book 1953

Comics
Biffo the Bear
Pansy Potter
Have-a-go Joe
Wee Peem's Magic Pills
Postie Hastie
Dennis the Menace
Willie's Wonder Gun
Skinny Flint
Ding-Dong Belle
Maxy's Taxi
Sammy's Super Rubber
The Magic Lollipops
Race to The Moon (a snakes and ladders style game featuring a load of Beano characters)
Bucktooth
Jack Flash and the Terrible Twins
Lord Snooty
Jimmy and his Magic Patch
The Iron Fish
The Tricks of Tom Thumb
Hawk-Eye Bravest of the Braves
Sinbad the Sailor
Tick-Tock Tony (This strip was another name for a horse that Jack Built)
The Wily Ways of Simple Simon

Text Stories
The Clockwork Cop
The Bird Boy
Smarty Smokey
Jack of Clubs
Waltzing Matilda
The Wangles of Granny Green
Ginger's Magic Ear

The Beano Book 1955

Comics
Biffo the Bear
Pansy Potter
Uncle Windbag
Kat and Kanary
Goggo the Goldfish
Roger the Dodger
Charlie Choo
Big Hugh and You
Dennis the Menace
Black Bun
Lord Snooty
The Invisible Giant
Nobby the Bobby
Wee Davie
Big Bazooka - It's about an ostrich
Red Rory of the Eagles
Young Robin Hood

Text Stories
Cast-Iron Stan
The Magic Bottle
Catapult Jack
Nutty the Coal Imp
Smarty Smokey
Mickey's Magic Bone

The Beano Book 1984
Dennis the Menace and Gnasher
The Bash Street Kids
Roger the Dodger
The 3 Bears
Minnie the Minx
Gnasher's Tale
Smudge
Pup Parade
Little Plum
Rasher Fashions
Billy Whizz
In The Army
Biffo the Bear
Grandpa
Out of This World
The Nibblers
Tom, Dick and Sally
Lord Snooty
Ball Boy
Baby Face Finlayson

The Beano Book 1999
Dennis the Menace and Gnasher
The Three Bears
Minnie the Minx
Ball Boy
General Jumbo
Billy Whizz
The Bash Street Kids
Crazy for Daisy
Roger the Dodger
Vic Volcano
Ivy the Terrible
Gnasher and Gnipper
Joe King
Camp Cosmos
Biffo the Bear
Calamity James
Go, Granny, Go!
Les Pretend

Other 'Strips'
It's A Bear's Life
If I Had My Own Annual
What To Do With A Sleeping Dad!
Where Do The Numskulls Go On Holiday?
When They Get Married
Les Pretend's DAFTAS
It Happens Once A Year...!

The Beano Book 2000
Dennis the Menace and Gnasher
Biffo the Bear
Ivy the Terrible
Calamity James
The Numskulls
Ball Boy
The Bash Street Kids
General Jumbo
Minnie the Minx
Gnasher and Gnipper
Les Pretend
Even Steven (comic)
Tim Traveller
Billy Whizz
Crazy for Daisy
Roger the Dodger

Other 'Strips'
Beafraid!... Be Very Afraid!
Ideal Homes
Stargazers (comic strip)
Roger's Alphabetical Dodge
The Beano Stars Cruise Round The World!
Driving Ambition
Give Sleep A Chance
Who'd BEA A Babysitter?
The Ballad of Calamity James
Joe King's Creature Feature
Ball Boy Gets Sporty!

The Beano Annual 2009
 Dennis the Menace
 The Bash Street Kids
Ivy the Terrible
Reservoir Dodge
Gnasher
The Numskulls
Billy Whizz
Minnie the Minx
Ratz
Pirates of the Caribeano
Roger the Dodger
Bea
General Jumbo
Johnny Bean from Happy Bunny Green
Fred's Bed
Nicky Nutjob
Little Plum
Derek the Sheep

The Beano Annual 2011
Fred's Bed
The Bash Street Kids
Minnie The Minx
The Numskulls
Billy Whizz
Les Pretend
Freddie Fear
Dennis the Menace
Lord Snooty
Ratz
Ball Boy
Beano Wars
Billy the Cat and Katie
Fiends Reunited
Super School
Ivy the Terrible
Roger The Dodger
General Jumbo
A day in the life of the Beano office

The Beano Annual 2012
Dennis the Menace and Gnasher
Ratz
The Bash Street Kids
Ivy the Terrible
Winston the Bash Street Cat
Ball Boy
Lord Snooty the Third
The Numskulls
Billy Whizz
Fred's Bed
Meebo and Zuky
Minnie the Minx
Roger the Dodger
Super School
Catastrophe
Calamity James
Les Pretend
The Nibblers
The Three Bears
The Bash Street Pups

The Beano Annual 2013

Comics

Dennis the Menace and Gnasher
Ball Boy
Meebo and Zuky
The Numskulls
Gnasher's Bit(e)
The Bash Street Kids
Ratz
Fred's Bed
Minnie the Minx
Billy Whizz
Bananaman
Roger the Dodger
Pup Parade
Number 13
Stinking Rich
Gnasher's Bit(e)

Prose stories

Vile Times with Evil Edgar: Potion in the Ocean!

The Beano Annual 2014

Comics

Dennis the Menace and Gnasher
Ball Boy
Pup Parade
Minnie the Minx
Ratz
The Numskulls
Roger the Dodger
[[Angel Face
Gnasher's Bit(e)
Billy Whizz
Meebo and Zuky
Biffo the Bear
Pansy Potter
Number 13
The Three Bears
Lord Snooty
Rasher
Little Plum
Bananaman

Poems

Revolting Rhymes

Prose stories

Pete's Science Project

The Beano Annual 2015

Comics

Dennis the Menace and Gnasher
Biffo the Bear
Calamity James
The Numskulls
The Bash Street Kids
Bananaman
The Three Bears
Minnie the Minx
Billy Whizz
Roger the Dodger
Little Plum

Funsize Funnies

Rasher
Pansy Potter
Pup Parade
Lord Snooty

The Beano Annual 2016

Comics

Billy Whizz
Dennis the Menace and Gnasher
The Bash Street Kids
Calamity James
Roger the Dodger
Biffo the Bear
The Numskulls
Bananaman
Lord Snooty
Minnie the Minx
Little Plum
Pup Parade
Ball Boy
Les Pretend
General Jumbo

Prose Stories

Lost in a Good Book

See also
The Beano
List of Beano comic strips
The Dandy
List of Dandy comic strips
List of Dandy comic strips by annual
The Beezer
List of Beezer comic strips
List of Beezer and Topper comic strips
                                                    

The Beano
Beano